The Municipality of The Glebe was a local government area of Sydney, New South Wales, Australia. The municipality was proclaimed on 1 August 1859 and, with an area of 2 square kilometres, included the modern suburbs of Glebe and Forest Lodge. The council was amalgamated with the City of Sydney to the east with the passing of the Local Government (Areas) Act 1948, although parts of the former council area were transferred in 1967 to the Municipality of Leichhardt to the west (now the Inner West Council).

Council history and location
The municipality was proclaimed by the Governor of New South Wales, Sir William Denison, on 1 August 1859, with the boundaries described in the Government Gazette as "bounded on the east by Bay-street, northerly, from the Parramatta Road, at the junction of the Newtown Road, to Blackwattle Swamp Cove on the north and west by the waters of Port Jackson, and by Johnston's Creek, upwards, to the Orphan School Creek; on the south by that creek, upwards, to the Parramatta Road; and by that road, easterly, to Bay-street aforesaid." On 16 August 1859, a further proclamation, following a petition, divided the municipality into three wards: Outer Glebe Ward, Inner Glebe Ward and Bishopthorpe Ward.

The Council first met on 1 September 1859, when the first chairman was elected, George Wigram Allen, who would be elected a further 17 times. Other early aldermen of the council included architects Edmund Blacket (1859–1870) and George Allen Mansfield (1866–1877), and the future NSW Premier George Dibbs (1870–1871). The first council meetings were held in the long room of a local hotel, but a few months later moved to a house which Chairman Allen had placed at their disposal until a purpose-built cottage was rented for the purposes of Municipal Chambers. In July 1879 the council approved a 5000-pound design for a new town hall located at the junction of St John's Road, Mount Vernon Street and Lodge Street, designed by Ambrose Thornley. The Town Hall, surmounted by a clock which had been donated by Sir George Wigram Allen, was completed and opened on 24 June 1880 by Mayor Dunn.

Following the enactment of the Municipalities Act, 1867, the title of chairman was renamed "Mayor" and the council became known as the Borough of The Glebe (From 28 December 1906, following the passing of the Local Government Act, 1906, the council was again renamed as the "Municipality of The Glebe"). On 17 January 1871, a further proclamation created a fourth ward, Forest Lodge Ward, in the south-west, with each ward now returning three aldermen each. With the bankruptcy and dire financial straits of its southern neighbour, Camperdown Council was moved to the position of amalgamating the council with one or several of its neighbours. A resolution passed by Camperdown on 27 October 1903 invited Glebe and Newtown councils to discussions over such a proposal, which was firmly rejected by The Glebe. Camperdown eventually merged with the City of Sydney in December 1908.

By 1925 the Glebe council was controlled by Labor representatives with 11 Labor Aldermen elected to council, and William Walsh became Glebe's first Labor Mayor. On 31 May 1939, the Minister for Local Government, Eric Spooner, recommended to the Governor, Lord Wakehurst, that Glebe Council be dismissed and replaced by an Administrator, Barton Hopetoun Nolan, the Inspector of Local Government Accounts for the Department of Local Government, whose report on the accounts of the council had unveiled significant misappropriation and corruption. Elections intended for February 1940 were postponed by the Minister for Local Government, Lewis Martin, and were eventually held on 8 December 1940, with five Australian Labor Party (Non-Communist) candidates elected aldermen.

By the end of the Second World War, the NSW Government had realised that its ideas of infrastructure expansion could not be effected by the present system of the patchwork of small municipal councils across Sydney and the Minister for Local Government, Joseph Cahill, following the recommendations of the 1945–46 Clancy Royal Commission on Local Government Boundaries, passed a bill in 1948 that abolished a significant number of those councils. Under the Local Government (Areas) Act 1948, The Glebe Municipal Council was merged with the larger neighbouring City of Sydney which was located immediately to the east and south, becoming the Glebe Ward, returning two aldermen.

Mayors

Town Clerks

References

Glebe
Glebe
Glebe
Glebe
Inner West